MX Prime previously Maximus Dan (born Edghill Thomas, 1979, Carenage, Trinidad and Tobago) is a soca / dancehall musician. He is also known by his former stage name Maga Dan.

After working with Jamaican producer Danny Browne between 1997 and 2000, and releasing dancehall and reggae influenced music, Maximus Dan moved in the direction of soca and has developed his own style.  His biggest hit single to date was "Fighter", which was made for the Soca Warriors (the Trinidad and Tobago national football team) in 2006. "Fighter" became the rallying song for the first ever appearance by Trinidad and Tobago in the FIFA World Cup finals in Germany.

His song "Love Generation" is featured on the Cricket 07 game by EA Sports for the PC and PlayStation.

History
Born and raised in the fishing village of Carenage on Trinidad's west coast, Edghill Thomas, was at first Magadan. He made a name for himself with a few local hits and was eager to collaborate with more established artistes. Although he was more than capable of standing on his own, he was prepared to learn how to survive in the music industry by walking with those who travelled the road before him.

He says of the time: “It wasn’t just a name change but a realisation of what I wanted to be, a leader not a follower. I wanted to bring a different element to the soca industry. It was so normal to sing a party song, festival tune, or road march contender, simply seeking a limited goal of touring after carnival (and settling for that). I wanted to stand out. I wanted to teach. I wanted people to listen – not just follow instructions, like put yuh hand in the air.”

He signed with Main Street Records in 1997, becoming one of the first artists out of Trinidad to work with a major Jamaican label. Under the supervision of producer Danny Browne, he was a featured artiste on the single Do you see what I see on the filthy rhythm with label mates Red Rat, Hawkeye, Goofy, General Degree and others. The rhythm sold well globally.

In 2000, when Magadan became Maximus Dan, he had a string of hits with his own style of soca music. Using his unmistakable voice to deliver conscious messages over driving blends of soca and dancehall music.

Obeah Man, Lash Satan, War, Kick It Way, Soca Train, Hosanna Fire, Earthquake, Order … are just a few of the offerings he has stamped on the national consciousness.

“I was always a man who liked to share knowledge. I grew up around people like that, so I felt being in that environment I wanted to bring that into my music and into the soca arena. It was hard in the beginning ‘cause everybody felt like I was preachin’ in the party,” says Maximus.

“I was always my own worst critic so I would sit down before I format a song and study what are the things to appeal to people … beats, pulse, the instruments and the cords … if you catch them with the music that’s how you draw them in. I make sure the beats are so infectious the words follow automatically.”

“I am still trying to find the perfect formula, there is always room for improvement and growth. When people listen they actually learn, and a good listener is a good learner. It’s all well and good to have a good time but you will have in the back of your mind at least one entertainer gave a message… empowerment, positivity.”

“Stevie Wonder, Sam Cooke, Ras Shorty, Bob Marley; they focused on the betterment and education of mankind that was the prime purpose of the music, for you to get the music and for you to live it out at the same time. We artistes are human beings too and we have so much power with the microphone in our hands, but when we come off that stage we go back to normal life and it’s about practicing what you are preaching as well … you need to live what you teach … I try to be the best I can be every single day.”

When the news came that Trinidad and Tobago’s national football team had qualified for the FIFA 2006 World Cup the streets erupted in spontaneous euphoria. The song on everyone’s lips, some with tears streaming down their faces was Soca Warrior by Maximus Dan.

It was a gift to the nation from a true patriot, an artist who has always used his pen to awaken our social consciousness.

The song was written in 2005 at a time when the team needed to feel lifted.

Maximus says: “I wanted to have a song to sing to infinity … til God come. I didn’t want it to just be a football song.”

This is his approach to all things, and what characterizes him as a messenger of the people.

References

21st-century Trinidad and Tobago male singers
21st-century Trinidad and Tobago singers
1979 births
Living people
Soca musicians